Saptha beryllitis is a moth in the family Choreutidae. It was described by Edward Meyrick in 1910. It is found on Japan, Taiwan, and India's Nicobar Islands.

References

Choreutidae
Moths described in 1910